Srđan Vuletić (born 1971) is a Bosnian filmmaker.

Personal life

Vuletić was born in Bijeljina, Bosnia and Herzegovina and attended school in Sarajevo, Bosnia and Herzegovina. At the age of eighteen he enrolled the Academy of Performing Arts in Sarajevo, dept. of directing, where he directed three plays: Pirandelo's The Naked Life, Ionesco's The Leader and Buchner's Woyczek, as well as a number of student films and exercises.

The 1992-1995 war in Bosnia interrupted his editing of the documentary The Orthodox Church. In the war he joined a hospital crew as a medical technician, an experience that later inspired his film I Burnt Legs. Also, during the war he produced documentary film about eight Sarajevo artists and the exhibition they held during this period and which was later to become the official Bosnian entry to the 45th Venice Biennale.

Career

Vuletić directed the award-winning film "Hop, Skip, and Jump" (Troskok) in 1999 and his first feature-length movie, "Summer in the Golden Valley" ("Ljeto u Zlatnoj Dolini") in 2003.

Filmography

Ljeto u zlatnoj dolini (2003)
It’s Hard to be Nice (2007)

External links
 

1971 births
Living people
Bosnia and Herzegovina film directors
People from Bijeljina